Bigger than Us may refer to:

Bigger than Us (album), a 2001 album by Aurora
"Bigger than Us" (Michael Rice song), a 2019 song by Michael Rice representing UK in the Eurovision Song Contest 2019
"Bigger than Us" (White Lies song), a 2011 song by White Lies
"Bigger than Us", a song by Miley Cyrus from her album Hannah Montana 2: Meet Miley Cyrus
"Bigger than Us", a song by Josh Groban on the 2018 album Bridges
"Bigger Than Us (documentary)", a 2021 documentary film directed by Flore Vasseur